Belmont, a suburb of Lower Hutt, to the north of Wellington in the North Island of New Zealand, lies on the west bank of the Hutt River, on State Highway 2 (SH 2), the Wellington-Hutt main road, and across the river from the centre of Lower Hutt.

It borders the Belmont Regional Park and features much native bush and scenic views.
The Belmont Picnic Grounds were a popular venue for outings in the early 1900s. They were operated originally by Mr Kilminster (ca. 1911–1914), then by Mr C. E. Clarke (ca. 1914–1919) and finally by Mrs Eliza Presants, wife of Philip Robert Presants, ca. 1920–1932.

The Institute of Geological and Nuclear Sciences has a kiosk substation in the area. The site has rocky or very stiff soil.

Belmont Railway Station, New Zealand closed in 1954.

Demographics

Belmont

Belmont had a population of 2,691 at the 2018 New Zealand census, an increase of 213 people (8.6%) since the 2013 census, and an increase of 345 people (14.7%) since the 2006 census. There were 936 households. There were 1,341 males and 1,350 females, giving a sex ratio of 0.99 males per female. The median age was 38.8 years (compared with 37.4 years nationally), with 495 people (18.4%) aged under 15 years, 486 (18.1%) aged 15 to 29, 1,371 (50.9%) aged 30 to 64, and 342 (12.7%) aged 65 or older.

Ethnicities were 80.9% European/Pākehā, 9.9% Māori, 3.6% Pacific peoples, 13.8% Asian, and 3.2% other ethnicities (totals add to more than 100% since people could identify with multiple ethnicities).

The proportion of people born overseas was 27.6%, compared with 27.1% nationally.

Although some people objected to giving their religion, 52.8% had no religion, 34.4% were Christian, 3.2% were Hindu, 0.8% were Muslim, 0.6% were Buddhist and 3.0% had other religions.

Of those at least 15 years old, 744 (33.9%) people had a bachelor or higher degree, and 213 (9.7%) people had no formal qualifications. The median income was $48,000, compared with $31,800 nationally. The employment status of those at least 15 was that 1,305 (59.4%) people were employed full-time, 342 (15.6%) were part-time, and 81 (3.7%) were unemployed.

Belmont Park

It does not include the Lower Hutt suburb of Belmont.

Belmont Park had a population of 333 at the 2018 New Zealand census, a decrease of 3 people (-0.9%) since the 2013 census, and a decrease of 36 people (-9.8%) since the 2006 census. There were 111 households. There were 165 males and 171 females, giving a sex ratio of 0.96 males per female. The median age was 45.4 years (compared with 37.4 years nationally), with 72 people (21.6%) aged under 15 years, 45 (13.5%) aged 15 to 29, 180 (54.1%) aged 30 to 64, and 33 (9.9%) aged 65 or older.

Ethnicities were 95.5% European/Pākehā, 7.2% Māori, 0.9% Pacific peoples, 4.5% Asian, and 3.6% other ethnicities (totals add to more than 100% since people could identify with multiple ethnicities).

The proportion of people born overseas was 19.8%, compared with 27.1% nationally.

Although some people objected to giving their religion, 60.4% had no religion, 29.7% were Christian, 0.9% were Hindu, 0.9% were Buddhist and 0.9% had other religions.

Of those at least 15 years old, 93 (35.6%) people had a bachelor or higher degree, and 30 (11.5%) people had no formal qualifications. The median income was $48,700, compared with $31,800 nationally. The employment status of those at least 15 was that 144 (55.2%) people were employed full-time, 60 (23.0%) were part-time, and 3 (1.1%) were unemployed.

Education

Raphael House Rudolf Steiner School is located in nearby Tirohanga.

References

External links
 Raphael House official website
 Belmont Regional Park

Suburbs of Lower Hutt
Populated places on Te Awa Kairangi / Hutt River